Bellton is an unincorporated community in Marshall County, West Virginia, United States. It was also known as Denver or Denver Station.

The community was named in honor of John Bell.

References 

Unincorporated communities in West Virginia
Unincorporated communities in Marshall County, West Virginia